Mathinna may refer to:

 Mathinna (Tasmanian), a girl from Tasmania
 Mathinna, Tasmania, a small town named after the girl